Paula S. England (born 4 December 1949), is an American sociologist and Dean of Social Science at New York University Abu Dhabi. Her research has focused on gender inequality in the labor market, the family, and sexuality. She has also studied class differences in contraception and nonmarital births.

Education 
England got a BA in Sociology and Psychology from Whitman College in the year 1971, an MA in Social Sciences from the University of Chicago in 1972, and a PhD in 1975, also from the University of Chicago.

Work 
England has served as a professor at the University of Texas-Dallas, University of Arizona, University of Pennsylvania, Northwestern University, Stanford University, and New York University. She served as president of the American Sociological Association from August 2014 to August 2015.

England's research showed that both men and women earn less if they work in a predominantly female occupation, even after adjusting for differences between occupations in the skill and education they require. She called this a type of sex discrimination distinct from lack of equal pay for equal work in the same job, and distinct from the hiring discrimination against women trying to enter jobs. She argued that employers—consciously or unconsciously—take the sex composition of jobs into account when they set pay levels, acting as if jobs done by women can't be worth much. She argued that this bias reflects a general cultural devaluation of women and roles associated with women, and that institutional inertia cements this bias into wage structures. She also showed that when occupations feminize, their pay goes down.

England has also studied how gender norms structure the college hookup culture, which features nonrelational sex.

Awards 
In 1999 the American Sociological Association recognized her with the Jessie Bernard Award for Distinguished Scholarship on Gender. In 2010 the American Sociological Association's Section on Sociology of the Family recognized her with a Distinguished Career Award. In 2009 she was elected the Frances Perkins Fellow by the American Academy of Political and Social Science. In 2015 the Population Association of America awarded her the Harriet Presser award for research on gender and demography. In 2018 she was elected to the National Academy of Sciences.

Selected bibliography

Books

Chapters in books

Articles 

 
 
 
 
 
 
 
  Also presented at the 1999 AEA.
 
 
 
 
 
  Text.

References

External links 
 Profile page: Paula England New York University

1949 births
American sociologists
Living people
New York University faculty
University of Chicago alumni
Whitman College alumni
American women sociologists
Place of birth missing (living people)
American Sociological Review editors
21st-century American women